Laxmi Das (1 May 1918 – 20 June 1985) was an Indian politician. He was a Member of Parliament, representing Miryalguda in the Lok Sabha, the lower house of India's Parliament, as a member of the Communist Party of India.

Das died in Hyderabad on 20 June 1985, at the age of 67.

References

External links
Official biographical sketch in Parliament of India website

1918 births
1985 deaths
Communist Party of India politicians from Telangana
India MPs 1962–1967
Lok Sabha members from Andhra Pradesh